The 2023 IIHF World Championship Division I will be an international ice hockey tournament run by the International Ice Hockey Federation.

The Group A tournament will be held in Nottingham, United Kingdom from 29 April to 5 May and the Group B tournament in Tallinn, Estonia from 23 to 29 April 2023.

Group A tournament

Participants

Standings

Results
All times are local (UTC+1)

Group B tournament

Participants

Standings

Results
All times are local (UTC+2)

References

External links
Official website of Division IA
Official website of Division IB

2023
Division I
2023 IIHF World Championship Division I
2023 IIHF World Championship Division I
Sports competitions in Nottingham
Sports competitions in Tallinn
2023 in British sport
2023 in Estonian sport
IIHF
April 2023 events in Estonia
May 2023 sports events in the United Kingdom
IIHF